Heinrich Heine Prize refers to three different awards named in honour of the 19th-century German poet Christian Johann Heinrich Heine:
 Heinrich Heine prize of Düsseldorf
 Heinrich Heine prize of the Ministry for Culture of the former GDR, which was assigned until 1990
 Heinrich Heine Prize of the "Heinrich-Heine-Gesellschaft" in Hamburg

Heinrich Heine prize of the city of Düsseldorf 

The Heinrich Heine prize of the city of Düsseldorf was established on the occasion of Heine's 175th birthday. The honor is awarded to personalities who through their work  in the spirit 
of Heine's emphasis on the basic rights of man, advance social and political progress, mutual understanding of the peoples, or spread the idea that all people belong to the same group: mankind. 
 
Beginning in 1972, the Heine prize was awarded every three years; since 1981 it was awarded every two years. The assignment of the Heine prize 1995 was shifted to the year 1996. Since that time the Heine prize is again awarded every two years.

Recipients 

 1972 Carl Zuckmayer
 1974 Kito Lorenc
 1975 Pierre Bertaux
 1978 Sebastian Haffner
 1981 Walter Jens
 1983 Carl Friedrich von Weizsäcker
 1985 Günter Kunert
 1987 Marion Gräfin Dönhoff
 1989 Max Frisch
 1991 Richard von Weizsäcker
 1993 Wolf Biermann
 1996 Władysław Bartoszewski
 1998 Hans Magnus Enzensberger
 2000 W. G. Sebald
 2002 Elfriede Jelinek
 2004 Robert Gernhardt
 2006 not awarded
 2008 Amos Oz
 2010 Simone Veil
 2012 Jürgen Habermas
 2014 Alexander Kluge
 2016 A. L. Kennedy
 2018 Leoluca Orlando
 2021 
 2022 Yurii Andrukhovych

Controversy concerning Peter Handke 
The jury that decided the prize consisted of 5 members of the city government, 1 representative of the state of North Rhine-Westphalia, the rector of the Heinrich Heine University, and 5 other members (critics and literary experts). The 5 members from the city government have 1 vote each, the others 2 votes each.

On 20 May 2006, the jury voted 12:5 to award the prize to Peter Handke (the state representative was not present). The mayor congratulated Handke, and Handke accepted the award.
According to press reports, a majority of the city council of Düsseldorf did not want to award the prize to Handke, arguing that his (perceived) support of Slobodan Milošević's oppressive regime was in blatant conflict with the spirit of the prize. According to the statutes of the Heine prize, "the city council awards the prize based on the decision of the jury". On 2 June 2006, jury members Siegrid Löffler and Jean-Pierre Lefèbvre declared to leave the jury in protest.

In a letter to Düsseldorf's Mayor Joachim Erwin dated 2 June 2006, Mr Handke refused the award, as he did not want himself and his work to be "exposed again and again to the scorn of party politicians". In a reply of 7 June 2006, Mr Erwin expressed his solidarity with Handke.

Heinrich Heine Prize of the Heinrich-Heine-Gesellschaft
Since 1965, the Heinrich-Heine-Gesellschaft ("Heine Society") of Hamburg has presented a literary prize at irregular intervals. It consists of a bronze object "Die Schere der Zensur" ("the scissors of censorship") made by sculptor Bert Gerresheim.

Recipients
1965 Max Brod
1972 Hilde Domin
1976 Marcel Reich-Ranicki
1981 Martin Walser
1984 Peter Rühmkorf
1989 Kay und Lore Lorentz
1992 Sarah Kirsch
1994 Tankred Dorst
1997 Ruth Klüger
2000 Bernhard Schlink
2003 Dieter Forte
2006 Alice Schwarzer
2009 Herta Müller
2012 Dževad Karahasan

Heinrich Heine prize of the Ministry for culture of the GDR 
The Heinrich Heine prize of the Ministry for culture of the GDR 1950 donated and once annually awarded for lyric works and works of literary journalism. The height of the prize amounted to 15,000 Marks.

Recipients 

 1953 Stefan Heym
 1957 Herbert Nachbar
 1959 Heiner Müller, Wieland Herzfelde
 1960 Gerd Semmer
 1961 Armin Müller
 1962 Hermann Kant
 1963 Heinz Kahlau
 1964 Christa Wolf, Hugo Huppert
 1965 Heinz Knobloch
 1970 Rolf Recknagel
 1971 Volker Braun
 1972 Stephan Hermlin, Hans Kaufmann
 1973 Sarah Kirsch, Ulrich Plenzdorf
 1974 Kito Lorenc
 1975 Irmtraud Morgner, Eva Strittmatter
 1976 Dieter Süverkrüp
 1977 Heinz Czechowski
 1978 Egon Richter
 1979 Jürgen Rennert
 1984 Bernt Engelmann (?), John Erpenbeck
 1985 Peter Gosse
 1987 Luise Rinser
 1988 Peter Rühmkorf
 1990 Hans-Eckardt Wenzel

See also 
 German literature
 List of literary awards
 List of poetry awards
 List of years in literature
 List of years in poetry

References

External links 
 Der Heine-Preis der Landeshauptstadt Düsseldorf (official website)
 Bestimmungen über die Verleihung des Heine-Preises der Landeshauptstadt Düsseldorf vom 24. Juni 1971 (regulations regarding awarding of the prize)
 Zum Heinrich-Heine-Preis der DDR

Culture in Düsseldorf
German literary awards
Heinrich Heine
Municipal awards
Awards established in 1972
Awards established in 1965
Awards established in 1953
Awards disestablished in 1990
East German awards